Armand-e Olya (also Romanized as Armand-e ‘Olyā and Armand Olya; also known as Armān and Ārmand-e Bālā) is a village in Armand Rural District, in the Central District of Lordegan County, Chaharmahal and Bakhtiari Province, Iran. At the 2006 census, its population was 1,730, in 392 families.

References 

Populated places in Lordegan County